This is a list of mayors of the city of Lorain

References

Lorain, Ohio
 Mayors